Arne Sæter (21 August 1913 in Surnadal – 14 September 1973) was a Norwegian politician for the Christian Democratic Party.

He was elected to the Norwegian Parliament from Møre og Romsdal in 1969. Shortly before the end of his term, he died and was replaced by Sverre Moen.

On the local level he was a member of Rindal municipality council from 1959 to 1971, serving as mayor from 1963 to 1967. From 1963 to 1967 he was also a member of Møre og Romsdal county council.

Outside politics he graduated as cand.theol. in 1940, and worked as a priest.

References

1913 births
1973 deaths
Members of the Storting
Christian Democratic Party (Norway) politicians
Mayors of places in Møre og Romsdal
20th-century Norwegian politicians
People from Surnadal